Helen Jean Rogers Secondari (September 27, 1928 – March 28, 1998) was an American television producer. She won five Emmy Awards and two Peabody Awards with her fellow producer and husband John H. Secondari.

Biography 
Helen Jean Rogers graduated magna cum laude and Phi Beta Kappa from the Catholic University of America. She received a Master of Arts from Radcliffe College and became one of the first female teaching fellows at Harvard University.

In 1961, Rogers married John H. Secondari with whom she co-produced Saga of Western Man. They a daughter, Linda Helen. In addition she was step-mother to John's son, John Gerry, from his previous marriage. She died on March 28, 1998 in New York City.

Filmography 
 1963 - Saga of Western Man (producer)
 1967 - Christ Is Born (1967) (director)
 1968 - Rehearsal for D-Day (1967) (director)

References

External links 
 
 Helen Jean Rogers at the British Film Institute

1928 births
1998 deaths
American television producers
American women television producers
Radcliffe College alumni
Harvard Fellows
Catholic University of America alumni
20th-century American women
20th-century American people